Counselman v. Hitchcock, 142 U.S. 547 (1892), is a United States Supreme Court case in which the Court ruled that not incriminating an individual for testimony was not the same as not requiring them to testify at all. The court reasoned that as long as evidence arising from the compelled testimony could incriminate the individual in any way, the Fifth Amendment guarantee against self-incrimination was not satisfied. The court then adopted the broader "transactional immunity" rule.

References

External links
 

United States Supreme Court cases
United States Supreme Court cases of the Fuller Court
1892 in United States case law
United States Fifth Amendment self-incrimination case law
Legal history of Illinois